Christy James Pym (born 24 April 1995) is a professional footballer who plays as a goalkeeper for Mansfield Town, on loan from League One club Peterborough United.

Club career

Exeter City
Pym was born in Exeter, Devon. He came through the youth ranks at his hometown club, Exeter City. Pym was captain of the under-18 team when he was handed a professional contract by manager Paul Tisdale in April 2013.

Pym made his debut for Exeter as cover for Artur Krysiak in a 3–2 victory over Southend United at Roots Hall on 15 February 2014. He went on to become first choice keeper for the last five league matches of the season and was rewarded with a new contract at the end of the season. He began the season as Exeter's first-choice goalkeeper after Artur Krysiak was released.

In 2014–15, Pym battled for starting position against fellow 19-year-old James Hamon, eventually playing 25 league games to the latter's 21. The following season, new Austrian signing Bobby Olejnik was the undisputed starting goalkeeper in league games, until Pym edged back into the line-up in October 2016.

In May 2019, Exeter manager Matt Taylor said he expected Pym to leave the club on a free transfer.

Peterborough United
Pym joined League One club Peterborough United on a free transfer on 29 May 2019, signing a three-year contract.

Pym signed for League Two club Stevenage on loan on 27 December 2021, effective from 3 January 2022, for the remainder of the 2021–22 season. The move meant Pym would be reunited with manager Paul Tisdale.

On 12 July 2022, Pym signed for Mansfield Town on a season-long loan.

International career
On 28 August 2014, Pym received his first call-up to the England under-20 team for a friendly match against Romania.

Pym is also eligible for the Republic of Ireland.

Career statistics

References

External links
Profile at the Exeter City F.C. website

1995 births
Living people
Sportspeople from Exeter
Footballers from Devon
English footballers
England youth international footballers
Association football goalkeepers
Exeter City F.C. players
Peterborough United F.C. players
Stevenage F.C. players
Mansfield Town F.C. players
English Football League players